Maxwell Charles Close (25 June 1827 - 25 January 1903) was an Irish Conservative politician who sat in the House of Commons in two periods between 1857 and 1885.

Close was the eldest son of Colonel Maxwell Close of Drumbanagher and his wife Anna Elizabeth Brownlow, sister of  Charles Brownlow, 1st Baron Lurgan. He was educated at Eton College and Christ Church, Oxford. He was a J. P.  and a Deputy Lieutenant for County Armagh and was High Sheriff of Armagh in 1854.

At the 1857 general election Close was elected Member of Parliament for Armagh and held the seat until 1864. He was re-elected in 1874 and held the seat until 1885.

Close died at the age of 75.

Close married Catherine Deborah Agnes Close, daughter of Henry S. Close of Newtown Park, Dublin in 1852.

References

External links

1827 births
1903 deaths
Members of the Parliament of the United Kingdom for County Armagh constituencies (1801–1922)
UK MPs 1880–1885
UK MPs 1857–1859
UK MPs 1859–1865
UK MPs 1874–1880
High Sheriffs of Armagh
People educated at Eton College
Alumni of Christ Church, Oxford
Deputy Lieutenants of Armagh